The Sheridan County Courthouse, located at 2nd and Sprague Sts. in Rushville, Nebraska, was built in 1904.  It was listed on the National Register of Historic Places in 1990.  It has also been designated Nebraska historic site SH08-1.

It is an example of the "County Capitol" architecture type, and, along with the Cherry County Courthouse, is one of the "less intricate" examples of the type, having a single squared tower, rather than having a dome and several towers.

References

External links 
More photos of the Sheridan County Courthouse at Wikimedia Commons

Courthouses on the National Register of Historic Places in Nebraska
Romanesque Revival architecture in Nebraska
Government buildings completed in 1904
Buildings and structures in Sheridan County, Nebraska
County courthouses in Nebraska
Historic districts on the National Register of Historic Places in Nebraska
National Register of Historic Places in Sheridan County, Nebraska